Symbatica heimella is a moth in the family Gelechiidae. It was described by Viette in 1954. It is found in Madagascar.

References

Gelechiinae
Moths described in 1954
Taxa named by Pierre Viette